Ratan Kumari Devi was an Indian politician. She was a Member of Parliament, representing Madhya Pradesh in the Rajya Sabha the upper house of India's Parliament as a member of the Indian National Congress.

References

1913 births
1997 deaths
Rajya Sabha members from Madhya Pradesh
Indian National Congress politicians from Madhya Pradesh
Madhya Pradesh MLAs 1962–1967
Madhya Pradesh MLAs 1967–1972
Madhya Pradesh MLAs 1972–1977
Women members of the Madhya Pradesh Legislative Assembly
Women members of the Rajya Sabha